Platygobiopsis dispar is a species of goby known only from the area off central Vietnam in the South China Sea.

References

Gobiidae
Fish of Vietnam
Taxa named by Artem Mikhailovich Prokofiev
Fish described in 2008